Anatoliy Shakun (born 1948, in Constanța) is a Soviet midfielder and coach.

References

External links
 Master of Sport in football on FC Zorya Luhansk website
 Anatoliy Shakun on footballfacts.ru
 Anatoliy Shakun on Luhansk Our Football

1948 births
Living people
Sportspeople from Constanța
Romanian emigrants to the Soviet Union
Romanian emigrants to Ukraine
Soviet footballers
FC Zorya Luhansk players
FC CSKA Kyiv players
FC Shakhtar Stakhanov players
Soviet football managers
Ukrainian football managers
FC Zorya Luhansk managers
FC Hirnyk Rovenky managers
FC Shakhtar Luhansk managers
Ukrainian Premier League managers
Association football midfielders